Roger Martin is chair to the Board of Trustees, Population Matters (formerly the Optimum Population Trust) and President of the Somerset Branch, Campaign to Protect Rural England.

Education
Westminster school, Brasenose College, Oxford,

Career
VSO Northern Rhodesia, 1959–60;
Civil rights campaigner in Alabama, 1963;
Founder member of Campaign Against Racial Discrimination;
Commonwealth Office, 1964–66;
Second Secretary, Djakarta, 1967; Saigon,1968–70;
First Secretary, Foreign and Commonwealth Office, 1971–74;
Geneva, 1975–79;
Seconded to Department of Trade, as Head of Middle East/North Africa Branch,
Deputy High Commissioner, Harare, 1983–86, resigned in fury;
Author 'The Price of Apartheid' (Pub EIU 1988);
Visiting Fellow University of Bath
Member of National Executive, VSO, 1988–96;
Director, Somerset Wildlife Trust, 1988-2001 Vice President from 2001,
Member, Flood Defence and Pollution Committees, Environment Agency, 1990–2012;
SW panel, Ministry of Agriculture, Fisheries and Food, 1993–97;
SW Committee, Heritage Lottery Fund, 2001–06.
Founder member, South West Regional Assembly, 1998.
Exmoor National Park Authority: Member,1998-2008; Trustee, 2003–07.
SW Regional Chair, Campaign to Protect Rural England 2001–2006; national Trustee 2003–07; President Somerset Branch 2006-
President, Mendip Society, 2001-09

HARDtalk
On 13 December 2010, he appeared on the BBC News programme "HARDtalk" to discuss his Trust's stance.

Honours
He was made an Honorary Doctor of Science (Hon.DSc) by the University of the West of England in 2001.

References

External links
Roger Martin on BBC's Hardtalk
Roger Martin, Chair (Population Matters)
Roger Martin profile at Battle of Ideas
"Overpopulation is the biggest threat to our climate"  "The Great Debate UK", Reuters 16 October 2009
"the Optimum Population Trust", Rodaleworks

British diplomats
English environmentalists
Living people
Members of HM Diplomatic Service
1941 births
20th-century British diplomats